River Cottage is a brand used for a number of ventures by television chef Hugh Fearnley-Whittingstall. These include a long-running Channel 4 television series, cookery courses, events, restaurants and products such as beer and organic yogurts.

There are two River Cottage Kitchen restaurants championing organic and local food. These can be found in Axminster and Winchester. River Cottage HQ is a 100-acre farm on the Devon/Dorset border that follows the farm to fork ethos through its various endeavours. Among other things these include: cookery, gardening and craft courses, long table dining feasts in the 18th-century threshing barn and the 17th-century farmhouse which appeared in many of the later TV shows has recently been renovated to now host guests on a B&B and whole house rental basis. As well as this, River Cottage HQ holds many private events including parties, meetings and weddings.

Television series

The first TV series was Escape to River Cottage and was shown on Channel 4. In this show Fearnley-Whittingstall left London to pursue an ambition of self-sufficiency, growing his own vegetables and raising his own animals at a gamekeeper's cottage near Netherbury in Dorset. The series had six episodes and first aired in March and April 1999. It was followed by Return to River Cottage in 2000. and River Cottage Forever in 2001, in which viewers followed Fearnley-Whittingstall's further adventures as a downsized smallholder.

In 2004 the River Cottage brand left the original holiday home to follow Fearnley-Whittingstall's progress as he set up a new business from old dairy buildings near Broadoak, Bridport, Dorset in the series Beyond River Cottage. An additional series, The View from River Cottage, was a combination clip show and retrospective of the previous series.

The 2005 series, River Cottage Road Trip, follows Fearnley-Whittingstall as he explores Dumfriesshire, Cumbria and Lozells and East Handsworth, Birmingham for regional recipes that he can bring back home.

In 2006, moved to the Park Farm location near to Uplyme in Devon. Here at the new River Cottage H.Q., the team would film the 2006 series The River Cottage Treatment where Fearnley-Whittingstall would attempt to convert junk food lovers' eating habits.

The 2007 series, River Cottage: Gone Fishing, saw Fearnley-Whittingstall travel to fishing locations throughout the British Isles in order to promote the culinary benefits of sustainable fishing cultures.

In 2008, Channel 4 began broadcasting River Cottage Spring, later followed up by River Cottage Autumn, which shows Fearnley-Whittingstall using home-grown produce in recipes. The series also tracks a group of families in Bristol who attempt to convert a large bramble patch into a small-holding, now known as Bramble Farm, growing vegetables, and rearing meat. A four-episode series River Cottage: Summer's Here began airing in June 2009.

November 2009 saw the broadcasting of a new series titled River Cottage: Winter's on the Way, following Fearnley-Whittingstall as he grows, forages and cooks winter treats.

In 2010, a new series titled River Cottage Every Day was released, each episode concerning the specific topics of meat, fish, vegetables, fruit, breakfast, lunch, bread and treats.

During the year 2011 Fearnley-Whittingstall released the series River Cottage Veg, documenting his experiences of giving up meat whilst learning about different vegetarian cooking styles.

In July 2012, a new three-part series began on Channel 4, titled River Cottage: Three Go Mad. Fearnley-Whittingstall was joined at Park Farm by three celebrities, who wished to increase their knowledge on where their food comes from, and how it gets from farm and sea to plate.

In June 2022, a new four-part series titled River Cottage Reunited will premiere on More4.

Australian adaptation 

River Cottage Australia is an Australian adaptation of the series. It sees former chef Paul West showcase local produce and farming while attempting to live in a self-sufficient manner. The series premiered in 2013 on The LifeStyle Channel and ran for two seasons before moving to The LifeStyle Channel's sister network LifeStyle Food in 2015.

DVD releases

These DVDs are distributed by Channel 4 DVD.

Books 
A number of books have been produced to tie in with the series including:
 The River Cottage Cookbook 
 River Cottage Year 
 River Cottage Meat Book
 River Cottage Family Cookbook
 River Cottage Fish Book
 River Cottage Every Day
 River Cottage Veg Every Day
 River Cottage Fruit Every Day
 River Cottage Light & Easy

Locations of TV shows and other ventures

The original River Cottage 

The original River Cottage was a former weekend and holiday home, previously a gamekeeper's lodge in the grounds of Slape Manor, Netherbury, Dorset. This was used as the location for series 1-3 of the TV show.

River Cottage HQ 

The original River Cottage HQ (RCHQ) was near Broadoak, Bridport in Dorset and was home to the fourth TV series, Beyond River Cottage, which was based around the new project to develop the rural education centre in some old dairy buildings.

The RCHQ ran courses and activities celebrating and teaching the skills and values that Whittingstall learned in his five years as a Dorset smallholder. It focused in particular upon cooking in tune with the seasons, small scale local food production, and adding value to home grown produce for taking to local markets. The courses and events were hosted by different members of the River Cottage team, including some from the television series including Ray Smith (a freelance butcher) and Michael Michaud an organic polytunnel expert. 

In September 2006 River Cottage HQ moved to a new, larger, location.

River Cottage H.Q (Park Farm) 

In 2006, the show moved to a new location, also called River Cottage HQ, near the village of Musbury in East Devon.

River Cottage HQ provides dining experiences in the 18th-century threshing barn; cookery, craft and gardening courses covering a wide variety of topics including bee-keeping, breadmaking, cheese-making, curing meat and foraging; accommodation for guests to stay in the 17th-century farmhouse on a B&B or exclusive use basis following its renovation in early 2019; and hosts a number of private events each year including parties, meetings and weddings.

In early February 2012, River Cottage's events barn was largely destroyed by a fire. It has since been rebuilt.

Other business ventures

The River Cottage team has opened the River Cottage Canteen and Deli, a local produce shop and informal restaurant in Trinity Square, Axminster, in a building that formerly housed the town's ballroom. In November 2011, a second Canteen and Deli was opened in Plymouth, in the historic Royal William Yard, although the Plymouth restaurant has now closed and a third canteen was opened in Bristol in March 2013, now also closed. A fourth canteen opened in Winchester, in September 2014. The Canteens have since been re-branded under the name River Cottage Kitchens but they continue to serve local, organic, seasonal food ensuring plants are at the heart of it, but also respectfully using meat and fish from local, sustainable, high welfare sources.

References

External links
The River Cottage - contains recipes, news and features.
River Cottage at Channel 4 - contains information on most shows.

1999 British television series debuts
Channel 4 original programming
Food reality television series
Buildings and structures in Dorset
Buildings and structures in Devon
Cottages in Dorset